Farmer Township is a township in Rice County, Kansas, in the United States.

Farmer Township was established in 1874.

References

Townships in Rice County, Kansas
Townships in Kansas